The revived 1975 European Rugby League Championship used traditional structures that saw a return to the one game format. It was also known as the International Triangular Tournament, as it involved only three nations, England, France and Wales. This was the seventeenth competition and was won for the eighth time by England.

Results

Final standings

England win the tournament with two victories.

References

European Nations Cup
European rugby league championship
International rugby league competitions hosted by the United Kingdom